Leucopogon newbeyi is a species of flowering plant in the heath family Ericaceae and is endemic to a small area in the southwest of Western Australia. It is an erect shrub with densely hairy young branchlets, linear to narrowly elliptic or narrowly egg-shaped leaves and erect, compact clusters of 7 to 17 white, bell-shaped flowers mainly on the ends of branches.

Description
The edges of the leaves are usually turned down or rolled under, the upper surface glabrous and lower surface hairy but sometimes concealed.

Taxonomy and naming
Leucopogon newbeyi was first formally described in 2012 by Michael Clyde Hislop in the journal Nuytsia from specimens he collected near Ongerup in 2011. The specific epithet (newbeyi) honours Kenneth Newbey.

Distribution and habitat
This leucopogon grows in the understorey of mallee woodland and occurs in a narrow band from near Nyabing to south of Ongerup in the Mallee bioregion of south-western Western Australia.

Conservation status
Leucopogon newbeyi is listed as "Priority Three" by the Government of Western Australia Department of Biodiversity, Conservation and Attractions, meaning that it is poorly known and known from only a few locations but is not under imminent threat.

References

newbeyi
Ericales of Australia
Flora of Western Australia
Plants described in 2012